Nakuru Rugby Football Club also known as 'Wanyore' is a Kenyan rugby club based in Nakuru. It has played for several years in the Kenya Cup and Eric Shirley Shield leagues run by the Kenya Rugby Football Union. Nakuru RFC operates and trains at the Nakuru Athletic Club Grounds in Nakuru. They play at the 2,000-capacity Nakuru Stadium.

Nakuru Rugby Football Club is the most successful club out of Nairobi and one of the upcountry rugby teams that participates in Kenya Cup (the league) alongside Kisumu, Eldoret, Western Bulls, Kabras and Mombasa. In addition to the senior team, Nakuru RFC has a second team 'Nakuru II which participates in the Eric Shirley Shield. The club also runs a mini rugby program, a development women’s team, and a scholarship program for talented underprivileged players. The management committee consists of the chairman and a nine-man sitting committee who run the affairs of the club.

The team finished second in the 2012 Kenya Cup (Premier Rugby League in Kenya) before being crowned champions in 2013. In 2014, the team is in the hunt for double honours yet again, qualifying for the finals of both the Kenya Cup, and Enterprise Cup.

The Team also boast of an elaborate youth development system, with Under 12, Under 14 and Under 16 sides.

Nakuru Rugby Football Club is host to the two international tournaments in the Kenya Rugby Union Calendar: The Great Rift 10-A-Side and The Prinsloo Sevens (named after a late supporter and member) part of the National Sevens Circuit.

In 2008, the club won its first major trophy for decades after winning the Enterprise Cup (the national cup competition). The club also won the Enterprise Cup in 1948, 1958, 1960, 1962 and 1963.

Nakuru Rugby Football Club are joint winners of their own Great Rift 10-A-Side Tournament 2011 edition with Strathmore Leos. This came after a long dry spell of trophies in the 10-A-Side version of the game.

Monate Akuei
Mike Okombe
Gibson Weru
Oscar Ouma
Edwins Makori
Simon Wariuki
Nick Lang'o
Sammy Warui
Davis Yangah
Martin Mwita
Martin Owillah
Phillip Kwame
Dallo Chituyi
Joseph Maina
Isaiah Nyariki
Edwin Shimenga
Shem Ndeithi

References

External links 
Nakuru RFC

Kenyan rugby union teams
Sport in Rift Valley Province
Nakuru